Hamid Termina (born January 5, 1977) is a Moroccan footballer. He made his Bundesliga debut for FC Energie Cottbus on August 19, 2001 when he started in a game against Hertha BSC Berlin.

References

1977 births
Living people
Moroccan footballers
Morocco international footballers
Morocco under-20 international footballers
Moroccan expatriate footballers
Wydad AC players
FC Energie Cottbus players
Bundesliga players
Expatriate footballers in Germany
Expatriate footballers in Lebanon
Footballers from Casablanca
Association football midfielders
Moroccan expatriate sportspeople in Lebanon
Lebanese Premier League players
Safa SC players